Shlomo Breznitz (born 3 August 1936) is an Israeli author, psychologist, former professor of psychology, former rector and president of the University of Haifa, and previous member of the Knesset. He is the founder and currently one of the members of the board of directors of CogniFit, a brain fitness software company.

Early life
Breznitz was born in Bratislava in Czechoslovakia (today Slovakia). During the Holocaust he and his sister were hidden in a Roman Catholic orphanage, an experience detailed in his memoirs, "Memory Fields". His father was killed in Auschwitz, but his mother survived and they made aliyah to Israel in 1949. He studied psychology at the Hebrew University of Jerusalem, gaining a BA in 1960, an MA in 1962 and a PhD in 1965, the first person to receive a doctorate in the new field of psychology in Israel.

Later career
From 1969 until 1971, Breznitz served as a consultant to the Israeli Air Force on problems of stress. He was the founding director of the Ray D. Wolfe Center for Study of Psychological Stress at the University of Haifa in 1979. Breznitz also has served as the Lady Davis Professor of Psychology and was the visiting professor at the London School of Economics, Berkeley, Stanford, National Institutes of Health and Rockefeller University. He has also been a visiting scientist at the National Institute of Mental Health in Washington D.C.

He has written eleven books and has contributed chapters to over 20 other books in addition to numerous professional articles and research reports. In 1999 he retired from Haifa University to found brain fitness software company, CogniFit. He has been in the forefront of cognitive training using a personal computer and has developed patented technology that turns the personal computer into a tool for providing individualized training programs for a wide range of cognitive skills needed for everyday function and cognitive skills specific to particular fields of interest.

Politics
After Ehud Olmert, a personal friend, convinced him to enter politics, Breznitz was elected to the Knesset on the Kadima list in 2006, the first Slovak to become an MK. He was the founder of the India-Israel Parliamentary Friendship Group in the Knesset. However, he retired from politics and left the Knesset on September 28, 2007.

Bibliography
Books authored by Breznitz include:
Social Psychology Am-Oved, 1969 (Hebrew)
Stress in Israel Van Nostrand Reinhold Co., 1981
Handbook of Stress with L. Goldberger (Eds.). New York: Free Press of Macmillan, 1982
Denial of Stress International Universities Press, 1983
Cry Wolf: The Psychology of False Alarms Englewood Hills, N. J.: Lawrence Erlbaum Associates, 1984
Molecular Biology of Stress with O. Zinder (Eds.). New York: Alan R. Liss, Inc., 1988
Memory Fields New York, N.Y.: Alfred A. Knopf, 1992
Handbook of stress (2nd Revised Edition) with Leo Goldberger (Eds.) Free press, January 1993
Maximum Brainpower: Challenging The Brain for Health and Wisdom with Collins Hemingway. Ballantine Books, 2012
The Tapestry of Life. Hakibutz Hameuchad, 2012
Sinamatella: A Quest for Meaning. Dekel publishing house & Samuel Wachtman’s Sons, 2014.

References

External links 
 

1936 births
Living people
Czechoslovak emigrants to Israel
Czechoslovak Jews
Hebrew University of Jerusalem alumni
Israeli psychologists
Kadima politicians
Members of the 17th Knesset (2006–2009)
Academic staff of the University of Haifa
Presidents of universities in Israel